Roald Fourie Badenhorst (born 13 May 1991) is a South African-born New Zealand former cricketer.

Badenhorst was born at Pretoria in South Africa in 1991. He played first-class cricket in New Zealand for Central Districts between 2011/12 and 2013/14 and Otago between 2014/15 and 2015/16.

References

External links
 

1991 births
Living people
New Zealand cricketers
Central Districts cricketers
Otago cricketers
Cricketers from Pretoria
South African emigrants to New Zealand